Patrice Guillaume Athanase Talon (born 1 May 1958) is a Beninese politician and businessman who has been President of Benin since 6 April 2016.

Early life and career
Talon is of Fon origin and was born in Ouidah. He descends from slave traders. His father was from Ouidah while his mother came from a Guédégbé family in Abomey. He obtained a baccalaureate in Dakar, Senegal. After obtaining a "C" grade in his bachelor's degree in science at the University of Dakar, he was transferred to the École nationale de l'aviation civile in Paris. With dreams of becoming a pilot, Talon failed a medical test and this dream became impossible.

In 1983, Talon became involved in trading packaging and agricultural inputs. In 1985, he returned to Benin and established the Intercontinental Distribution Company (Société Distribution Intercontinentale; SDI), which supplies agricultural inputs to cotton producers. In 1990, after recommendations by the World Bank to liberalize economies in West African countries, Benin was called upon to withdraw from the cotton production chain. Talon then won the chance to establish three cotton ginning factories in Benin. He was also known as the "King of Cotton" for his involvement in the cotton industry. He built his empire due to connections with the Beninese political class.

Talon was one of President Thomas Boni Yayi's chief financial backers, financing his campaigns in the 2006 and 2011 elections. His company, Benin Control, acquired two nationally owned enterprises, Sodeco in 2009 and PVI in 2011. In 2011, Talon received management of Cotonou’s imports at the Port of Cotonou. In 2012, he fled to France after he was accused of embezzling more than 18 million euros in taxes. He fell out with Boni Yayi and was accused of involvement in a plot to kill him. He was pardoned in 2014. In 2015, Forbes listed Talon as sub-Saharan Africa's 15th-richest person, with wealth valued at approximately US$400 million.

President
Talon ran as an independent candidate in the March 2016 presidential election. He finished second to Prime Minister Lionel Zinsou of the Cowry Forces for an Emerging Benin in the first round of voting, but won the second round with 65% of the vote. Zinsou conceded on election night. On 25 March 2016, Talon said that he would "first and foremost tackle constitutional reform", discussing his plan to limit presidents to a single term of five years in order to combat "complacency". He also said that he planned to reduce the government from 28 to 16 members.

Talon was sworn in on 6 April 2016. The composition of his government was announced later that day. There was no prime minister, and two defeated presidential candidates who had backed Talon in the second round, Pascal Koupaki and Abdoulaye Bio-Tchane, were appointed to key posts, Secretary-General of the Presidency and Minister of State for Planning and Development, respectively. Talon pledged to increase Benin's fortunes in five years and improve its relationship with France. Some of his policy goals are to reduce the power of the executive and limit presidents to single terms of five years. He appointed 22 ministers, four of which were women.

On 4 April 2017, the National Assembly failed to pass a bill that would have led to a referendum on Talon's proposal to limit presidents to a single five-year term. 63 votes in the 83-member National Assembly were required for passage, and the bill received 60 votes. Talon said a few days later that he would not pursue the matter any further. He said he was saddened by the outcome of the vote but respected it because of his commitment to democracy. He declined to say whether he would stand for reelection in 2021, but eventually it was apparent that he would. Benin's democratic reputation has declined during Talon's presidency. Changes in the law mean that presidential candidates need the support of 16 members of parliament, and nearly all current MPs are members of parties that support Talon. It was predicted that Talon could be reelected unopposed. Ultimately, he was reelected with 86% of the vote.

In 2018, Sébastien Ajavon, an opponent who came third in the 2016 presidential election, was sentenced to 25 years in prison for "drug trafficking" and "forgery and fraud". Several opposition figures were sentenced to heavy prison terms in December 2021. Former Minister of Justice Reckya Madougou was sentenced to twenty years in prison for "terrorism", and the law professor Joël Aïvo to ten years for "money laundering" and "undermining state security". According to journalist and teacher Francis Kpatindé, Talon's policies have led to a decline in human rights and the right to strike.

Personal life
Talon is married to First Lady Claudine Gbènagnon from Porto-Novo and has two children.

References

1958 births
Beninese businesspeople
Cheikh Anta Diop University alumni
Fon people
Living people
Beninese Roman Catholics
People from Ouidah
Presidents of Benin
21st-century Beninese politicians